Țara Bârsei is a historic and ethnographic area in southeastern Transylvania, Romania with a mixed population of Romanians, Germans, and Hungarians.

Geography 

The Burzenland lies within the Southern Carpathians mountains ranges, bordered approximately by Apața in the north, Bran in the southwest and Prejmer in the east. Its most important city is Brașov. Burzenland is named after the stream Bârsa (Barca, Burzen, 1231: Borza), which flows into the Olt river. The Romanian word bârsă is supposedly of Dacian origin (see List of Romanian words of possible Dacian origin).

History

Middle Ages 
Based on archaeological evidence, it seems German colonization of the region started in the middle of the 12th century during the reign of King Géza II of Hungary. The German colonists from this region are attested in documents as early as 1192 when terra Bozza is mentioned as being settled by Germans (Theutonici).

In 1211 the region was given to the Teutonic Knights by King Andrew II of Hungary in return for guarding the southeastern border of the Kingdom of Hungary against the Cumans. While the king retained his right to mint currency and claims on gold or silver deposits that would be uncovered, he granted the Teutonic Order the right to establish markets and administer justice. The crusaders were also free from taxes and tolls. The Teutonic Knights began building wood-and-earth forts in the area and they had constructed five castles (quinque castra fortia): Marienburg, Schwarzenburg, Rosenau, Kreuzburg, and Kronstadt, some of which were made of stone. The military order was successful in reducing the threat of the nomadic Cumans. Medieval Saxons from the Holy Roman Empire developed farms and villages nearby to support the forts and settle the land. The territory was already populated at the time when was disputed. Some medieval sources indicate it was uninhabited, a view challenged by some scholars invoking archaeological and documentary evidence. Bountiful agricultural yields led to further colonization by German immigrants.

The Teutonic Knights disregarded the rights of the local bishopric, however, and angered Hungarian nobility which already had settlers in the region. Led by Béla, the heir to the throne, the nobility pressed the need to expel the knights upon King Andrew II after his return from the Fifth Crusade. Grand Master Hermann von Salza attempted to loosen the Order's ties to the Hungarian crown by drawing closer to the Papacy. Andrew subsequently evicted the Order with his army in 1225, although Pope Honorius III protested to no effect. The confusing status of the Teutonic Knights within the Kingdom of Hungary led Hermann von Salza to insist upon autonomy before committing the military order to Prussia.

Along with Germans, the kings of Hungary also settled Szeklers and Pechenegs in the region during the 12th and 13th centuries. Archaeological evidence for the same period also suggests a strong Romanian population inhabiting the villages later known as Șcheii Brașovului, Satulung, Baciu, Cernatu, and Turcheș (the former is today part of Brașov, while the latter four are today part of the adjacent town of Săcele). In the second half of the 13th century the Romanian population is attested in two documents: in the region of Bran (1252) and Tohani (1294), while in the second half of the 15th century out of nine villages from the domain of Bran seven were Romanian (villae valachicales, Bleschdörfer) and only two German.

At the Conference of Lutsk in 1429, Sigismund, Holy Roman Emperor and King of Hungary, suggested that the Teutonic Knights defend the region during the Ottoman wars in Europe. Led by Claus von Redewitz, a detachment of knights from Prussia was stationed in the Burzenland until half were killed during an Ottoman campaign in 1432.

20th century 

Transylvanian Saxons remained in the Burzenland until the 20th century. Beginning in 1976, most of these Germans began to immigrate to West Germany with the approval of the Communist Romanian regime.

Towns

In each case, the modern Romanian name is given first, followed by the German and Hungarian names.

 Apața (Geist, Apáca)
 Bod (Brenndorf, Botfalva)
 Bran (Törzburg, Törcsvár)
 Brașov (Kronstadt, Brassó)
 Codlea (Zeiden, Feketehalom)
 Cristian (Neustadt, Keresztényfalva)
 Crizbav (Krebsbach, Krizba)
 Dumbrăviţa (Schnakendorf, Szunyogszék)
 Feldioara (Marienburg, Földvár)
 Ghimbav (Weidenbach, Vidombák)
 Hălchiu (Heldsdorf, Höltövény)
 Hărman (Honigberg, Szászhermány)
 Măieruș (Nußbach, Szászmagyarós)
 Prejmer (Tartlau, Prázsmár)
 Râșnov (Rosenau, Barcarozsnyó)
 Rotbav (Rotbach, Szászveresmart)
 Săcele (Siebendörfer, Szecseleváros / Négyfalu)
 Sânpetru (Petersberg, Barcaszentpéter)
 Şercaia (Schirkanyen, Sárkány)
 Vulcan (Wolkendorf,  Szászvolkány)
 Zărnești (Zernescht, Zernest)

See also 
 Nösnerland
 Teutonic Knights
 Transylvanian Saxons

References

External links 

 Peasants and castles of the Burzenland 
 Former coat of arms of the Burzenland
 Map showing German settlements in Transylvania
 German mountain names in Burzenland 
 Romanian ethnographical areas
 Shooting the rooster - traditions of the Hungarian community from Țara Bârsei 
 http://www.brasovtravelguide.ro/en/brasov/events/junii-feast.php

 
Transylvanian Saxon communities
Historical regions of Transylvania
Brașov County
Teutonic Order